The 2018 Jin'an Open was a professional tennis tournament played on outdoor hard courts. It was the second edition of the tournament and was part of the 2018 ITF Women's Circuit. It took place in Lu'an, China, on 7–13 May 2018.

Singles main draw entrants

Seeds 

 1 Rankings as of 30 April 2018.

Other entrants 
The following players received a wildcard into the singles main draw:
  Liu Yanni
  Wang Meiling
  Zhao Qianqian

The following players received entry from the qualifying draw:
  Jiang Xinyu
  Sun Ziyue
  Tang Qianhui
  Yuan Chengyiyi

Champions

Singles

 Zhu Lin def.  Liu Fangzhou, 6–0, 6–2

Doubles
 
 Harriet Dart /  Ankita Raina def.  Liu Fangzhou /  Xun Fangying, 6–3, 6–3

External links 
 2018 Jin'an Open at ITFtennis.com

2018 ITF Women's Circuit
2018 in Chinese tennis
Jin'an Open